Tommy Callaghan (born 28 August 1969) is a Scottish footballer who played as a midfielder for Livingston.

Playing career

Aston Villa
He was in the youth ranks at Aston Villa, but never made a first team appearance for the club.

St Mirren and Kilmarnock
Callaghan began his professional career playing for St Mirren. He spent the 1988-1989 season on loan at Kilmarnock, but ultimately departed St Mirren without making a single first team appearance for the club.

Falkirk
Following his departure from Paisley, Callaghan signed for Falkirk in 1989.  He appeared 10 times for the Bairns, scoring 1 goal.

East Fife
The midfielder then signed for East Fife in a brief spell which saw him make just 4 appearances for the Fifers.

Stirling Albion
Callaghan signed for Stirling Albion in 1992 and enjoyed a three year spell at the club, racking up 62 appearances for the Binos.

Stranraer
He was on the move again in 1995, and arrived at Stranraer.  Callaghan appeared 25 times for the Stair Park club before departing at the end of the 1995-1996 season.

Dunfermline
Another short spell followed, this time at Dunfermline.  The midfielder made just three appearances during the 1995-1996 season before leaving the Pars at the end of the season.

Livingston
Callaghan signed for Livingston, who were recently renamed and relocated to West Lothian.  He scored two goals in 32 appearances for the club during the 1996-1997 season and was on the move again in the summer.

Ross County and Partick Thistle
The midfielder saw out the last three seasons of his playing career with Ross County and Partick Thistle before retiring and joining the coaching staff at Firhill.

Post playing career
After retiring, he joined the Partick Thistle under 18's coaching staff.

He later became a football agent.

Personal life
His father Tommy Callaghan played for Celtic.  His uncle Willie played for Dunfermline and Scotland.  His grandfather William, maternal great-uncles Patrick Flannigan and David Flannigan, cousin Willie Callaghan Jr, and nephew Liam Callaghan all played football to some extent.

References

External links
Tommy Callaghan on Soccerbase

1969 births
Living people
Scottish footballers
Scottish Football League players
Association football midfielders
Livingston F.C. players
St Mirren F.C. players
Kilmarnock F.C. players
Falkirk F.C. players
East Fife F.C. players
Stirling Albion F.C. players
Stranraer F.C. players
Dunfermline Athletic F.C. players
Ross County F.C. players
Partick Thistle F.C. players
Aston Villa F.C. players
Footballers from Glasgow